Stanisław-Adam Stempowski (27 January 1870 – 11 January 1952) was a Polish-Ukrainian politician and Grand Master of the National Grand Lodge of Poland.

Born in Huta Czernielewiecka, Podolia (then Russian Empire), he was educated in Krzemieniec (1879 – 1888) and studied in Dorpat (1888–1892). 
 
After World War I, Stanisław Stempowski served as the minister in several cabinets of the Ukrainian People's Republic (UNR) in 1920, headed by Isaak Mazepa, Viacheslav Prokopovych, and Andriy Livytskyi. He was also a minister in the government of the UNR in exile, until January 1922.  

At the end of 1921 he entered Freemasonry, and was a Grand Master of the National Grand Lodge of Poland (1926–1928). He left Masonry on 19 March 1938, fearing the anti-Masonic policy of the Polish government.

References

See also
List of Freemasons
Paulin Święcicki

1870 births
1952 deaths
People from Khmelnytskyi Oblast
People from Letichevsky Uyezd
Polish politicians
Masonic Grand Masters
Ukrainian politicians before 1991
Land cultivation ministers of Ukraine
Healthcare ministers of Ukraine
Polish Freemasons